Enrico Rossi (born 25 August 1958) is an Italian politician and former President of Tuscany.

Early life
He was born into a working-class family in 1958 and in 1982 he graduated with a Degree in Philosophy with a thesis on the Hungarian philosopher Ágnes Heller. During the university, he was part of the student movement and worked as a journalist. In 1985, he joined in the Italian Communist Party.

Mayor of Pontedera and Regional Assessor of Health 
From 1985 to 1990 he was a member of the City Council of Pontedera (an industrial town with a large Piaggio-Vespa factory), serving as Vice Mayor and Councillor for Social Policy and Urban Planning. Later, he became Mayor of the same city, holding the office for nine years, from 1990 to 1999. During his second term, Rossi fought against the move of the Piaggio from Pontedera to Nusco.

In 2000, Enrico Rossi was elected as a Member of the Regional Council of Tuscany, and for ten years he was Regional Assessor for Healthcare. Under his leadership, the regional public health services reached a high level of quality, with modern facilities and technologies, becoming the first in Italy, for the quality label "Essential Levels of Care" (LEA). Merit, evaluation and research were the cornerstones of his policies.

President of Tuscany
After being one of the founders of the Democratic Party in 2007, Enrico Rossi was elected as President of Tuscany in 2010 with a majority of about 60% of voters, leading a centre-left coalition. He ran again for the Presidency in 2015, and was then reelected. Since 2010 he is regularly among the top-3 most appreciated presidents of Italian regions, according to surveys run by Il Sole 24 Ore economic newspaper.

Giovanisì
In June 2011, Rossi launched Giovanisì. The program, cost €400 million and advantaged 100,000 youngs, comprised right to education, help to vocational education, civil service, credits to specialization studies and contribution to pay the rent.

From June 2011 to February 2014, there were 14,251 internships, 5,637 announcement for houses accepted, 4,000 projects to civil service, 1,500 young business financed, 80,000 benefits of scholarships. The European Commissioner László Andor acclaimed Rossi's program, based on a similar European project.

Solidary Tuscany
The program Solidary Tuscany ("Toscana Solidale") was created for a war on poverty, to support the more poor families and workers.
The program includes a baby bonus of €700 for infant, €700 for disabled children, €700 annual for numerous families, €3,000 of credit for occasional workers.

Spending review
Enrico Rossi launched a cut of the public spending. Since 2011, he earned the lowest pay between the Presidents of Region in Italy, like his assessors and the regional councillors. In May 2012, he sold off the "blue cars" (free public car of the Italian politicians) in favour of methane-powered Fiat Puntos. Regional officeholders travel in second class with trains, on budget airlines and from 2009 the spending of the Rossi Administration and staff was reduced of 60%.
In 2011 the number of regional councillors decreased from 65 to 55 and the assessors from 14 to 10. From 2015, the life annuity has been abolished.

Other issues
Rossi asked the central government not to renew Trenitalia's contract, but launch a European tender. Rossi exposed the poor condition of the trains, and demanded better public funding.

In 2013, Rossi created a new waste plan, with the proposal to realize 70% waste sorting by 2020, without new waste plants.

In 2014, Rossi created a landscape plan that protects 365 areas from possible "Ecomonsters" (buildings that spoil the landscape).

Commitment to the European Union 
In Europe, he is a socialist Member of the European Committee of the Regions (CoR) following the works of the Commission for Social Policy, Education, Employment, Research and Culture (SEDEC) and previously of the Commission for Economic Policy (ECON) and Commission for Natural Resources (NAT). He contributed to the work of these Commissions with three Reports on the "European Union programme for social change and innovation", "Youth Employment Package", and "A Council Recommendation for the integration of the Long-Term unemployed".

He is also vice-president of the Conference of Peripheral Maritime Regions (CPMR) in charge of Cohesion. Since the beginning of the post-2020 negotiations, he has actively contributed to the discussion on the future of Cohesion policy presenting also an Open contribution for the post 2020, a position outlining his views on the future of the Cohesion. Firmly convinced about the importance of the #Cohesionalliance, in view of the EU elections he launched a territorial campaign “Europe in Tuscany” underlining the importance of ESIF funds, personally visiting 100 projects financed by ERDF, EARDF and ESF in Tuscany. Representatives from DG REGIO including the former Commissioner of Regional Policy, Corina Creţu, participated in some visits. He has been invited to the “7th Cohesion Forum” where he presented the Case study of Tuscany.

Enrico Rossi is a convinced socialist and pro-European politician. In 2018, he was the promoter of the Manifesto "Left: Labour, Europe, Fairness, Tolerance" aiming at reforming the European governance, reinforcing the communitarian method and enhancing socialist identity. In 2019, he published a book "It is not enough to say Europe" with an introduction of the PES Spitzenkandidat Frans Timmermans and the British singer living in Tuscany, Sting.

References

Living people
1958 births
Presidents of Tuscany
Article One (political party) politicians
Democratic Party (Italy) politicians
Democrats of the Left politicians
Democratic Party of the Left politicians
Italian Communist Party politicians
21st-century Italian politicians
20th-century Italian politicians